Takaya Ogura (小倉 尚也, born 26 May 1994) is a Japanese kickboxer, currently competing in the super bantamweight division of K-1.

In August 2021, Combat Press ranked him as the #9 flyweight kickboxer in the world.

Kickboxing career

K-1

Early career
Ogura was scheduled to face Shuhei Kumura at Krush 89 on June 30, 2018. He lost the fight by majority decision.

Ogura was scheduled to face Ryota at K-1 World GP 2018: inaugural Cruiserweight Championship Tournament on September 24, 2018. He won the fight by a first-round knockout.

Ogura was scheduled to face Shuto Sato at REBELS 59 on December 5, 2018. He won the fight by a first-round knockout.

Ogura was scheduled to face Shoya Matsumoto at K-1 KRUSH FIGHT 99 on March 30, 2019. He won the fight by a third-round knockout.

Ogura was scheduled to face Yuta Hayashi at K-1 World GP 2019: Super Bantamweight World Tournament on June 30, 2019. He lost the fight by a first-round knockout.

Ogura was scheduled to face Ryuto at K-1 KRUSH FIGHT 106 on October 13, 2019. He lost the fight by split decision, after an extra round was fought.

Ogura was scheduled to face Lyra at Krush  117 on September 26, 2020. He won the fight by a second-round technical knockout.

Ogura was scheduled to face Yuto Kuroda at Krush 121 on January 23, 2021. He won the fight by unanimous decision, with scores of 30–28, 30–28 and 30–27.

Ogura was scheduled to face Kaito Komaki at Krush 125 on May 30, 2021. He won the fight by unanimous decision.

Krush Super Bantamweight tournament
Ogura participated in the 2021 Krush Super Bantamweight tournament, held to crown the new champion. He was scheduled to face Sho Uchida in the tournament quarterfinals, held at Krush 128 on August 21, 2021. Despite coming into the bout as a favorite, he lost the fight by unanimous decision, with scores of 29–28, 29–28 and 29–27. Ogura suffered the only knockdown of the fight in the second round.

Continued super bantamweight career
Ogura was booked to face the former Krush bantamweight champion Koki at Krush 135 on March 26, 2022. He lost the fight by majority decision, with scores of 28–27, 28–28 and 28–27.

Ogura faced Chikara Iwao, who returned to competition following a seven-year absence from the sport, at Krush 140 on August 27, 2022. He lost the fight by a first-round knockout.

Ogura faced Kazuya Sato at KNOCK OUT 2022 vol.8 on December 11, 2022. He won the fight by unanimous decision.

Ogura faced Reo Kudo at KNOCK OUT 2023 SUPER BOUT BLAZE on March 5, 2023. He won the fight by a first-round knockout.

Fight record

|-  style="text-align:center; background:#cfc;"
| 2023-03-05 || Win||align=left| Reo Kudo || KNOCK OUT 2023 SUPER BOUT BLAZE  || Tokyo, Japan ||  KO (Punches) || 1 || 3:00

|-  style="text-align:center; background:#cfc;"
| 2022-12-11 || Win ||align=left| Kazuya Sato || KNOCK OUT 2022 vol.8  || Tokyo, Japan || Decision (Unanimous)|| 3 ||3:00 
|-  style="background:#fbb;"
| 2022-08-27 || Loss || align=left| Chikara Iwao || Krush 140 || Tokyo, Japan || KO (Body punches)  || 1 || 2:03
|-  style="background:#fbb;"
| 2022-03-26 || Loss || align=left| Koki || Krush 135 || Tokyo, Japan || Decision (Majority) || 3 || 3:00

|-  style="background:#fbb;"
| 2021-08-21 || Loss ||align=left| Sho Uchida || Krush 128, Tournament Quarterfinal || Tokyo, Japan || Decision (Unanimous) || 3 || 3:00
|-
|-  style="background:#cfc;"
| 2021-05-30 || Win ||align=left| Kaito Komaki || Krush 125 || Tokyo, Japan || Decision (Unanimous) || 3 || 3:00
|-
|-  style="background:#cfc;"
| 2021-01-23 || Win ||align=left| Yuto Kuroda || Krush 121 || Tokyo, Japan || Decision (Unanimous) || 3 || 3:00
|-
|-  style="background:#cfc;"
| 2020-09-26 || Win ||align=left| Lyra || Krush 117 || Tokyo, Japan || TKO (Three knockdowns) || 2 || 2:56
|-
|-  style="background:#fbb;"
| 2019-10-13 || Loss ||align=left| Ryuto || K-1 KRUSH FIGHT 106 || Tokyo, Japan || Ext. R. Decision (Split) || 4 || 3:00
|-
|-  style="background:#fbb;"
| 2019-06-30 || Loss ||align=left| Yuta Hayashi || K-1 World GP 2019: Super Bantamweight World Tournament || Tokyo, Japan || TKO (Punches) || 1 || 1:44
|-
|-  style="background:#cfc;"
| 2019-03-30 || Win ||align=left| Shoya Matsumoto || K-1 KRUSH FIGHT 99 || Tokyo, Japan || KO (Right straight) || 3 || 1:15
|-
|-  style="background:#cfc;"
| 2018-12-05 || Win ||align=left| Shuto Sato || REBELS 59 || Tokyo, Japan || KO (Right hook) || 2 || 1:57
|-
|-  style="background:#cfc;"
| 2018-09-24 || Win ||align=left| Ryota || K-1 World GP 2018: inaugural Cruiserweight Championship Tournament || Tokyo, Japan || KO (Right straight) || 1 || 0:38
|-
|-  style="background:#fbb;"
| 2018-06-30 || Loss ||align=left| Shuhei Kumura || Krush 89 || Tokyo, Japan || Decision (Majority) || 3 || 3:00
|-
|-  style="background:#cfc;"
| 2018-04-22 || Win ||align=left| Kazuki Okawa || Krush 87 || Tokyo, Japan || TKO (Punches and knees) || 2 || 0:50
|-
|-  style="background:#fbb;"
| 2017-10-01 || Loss ||align=left| Riku Morisaka || Krush 81 || Tokyo, Japan || Decision (Majority) || 3 || 3:00
|-
|-  style="background:#fbb;"
| 2017-07-08 || Loss ||align=left| Shota Oiwa || KHAOS 3 || Tokyo, Japan || Decision (Majority) || 3 || 3:00

|-  style="background:#cfc;"
| 2017-04-16|| Win ||align=left| Junichi Matsumoto || REBELS.50 || Tokyo, Japan || KO || 2 || 0:45

|-  style="background:#cfc;"
| 2017-03-11|| Win ||align=left| Shinya Hanzawa || REBELS.49 || Tokyo, Japan || Decision (Unanimous) || 3 || 3:00

|-  style="background:#cfc;"
| 2016-11-30|| Win ||align=left| Masafumi Nakai || REBELS.47 || Tokyo, Japan || Decision (Majority) || 3 || 3:00

|-  style="background:#c5d2ea;"
| 2016-10-16 || Draw||align=left| Riku Morisaka || Shuken 32 || Tokyo, Japan || Decision ||3 ||3:00  

|-  style="background:#fbb;"
| 2016-06-01|| Loss ||align=left| Masaji Tozuka || REBELS.43 || Tokyo, Japan || Decision (Majority) || 3 || 3:00

|-  style="background:#fbb;"
| 2016-03-09 || Loss ||align=left| Yudai Suzuki || REBELS.41 || Tokyo, Japan || Decision (Unanimous) || 3 || 3:00

|-  style="background:#cfc;"
| 2016-01-24|| Win ||align=left| Suksonleo StudioGym || REBELS.40 || Tokyo, Japan || Decision (Unanimous) || 3 || 3:00

|-  style="background:#cfc;"
| 2015-11-15|| Win ||align=left| Hokuto || Bigbang the future 15 || Tokyo, Japan || Decision || 3 || 3:00

|-  style="background:#c5d2ea;"
| 2015-07-12 || Draw ||align=left| Takuya Oyama || REBELS.37 || Tokyo, Japan || Decision (Majority) || 3 || 3:00

|-  style="background:#cfc;"
| 2015-05-10|| Win ||align=left| Harashima Mormot Yuji || REBELS.36 || Tokyo, Japan || Decision (Majority) || 3 || 3:00

|-  style="background:#cfc;"
| 2014-12-23|| Win ||align=left| Masachika Morimoto || REBELS.32 || Tokyo, Japan || KO || 2 || 2:32

|-  style="text-align:center; background:#fbb;"
| 2014-09-21|| Loss ||align=left| Taio Asahisa ||J-FIGHT in Shinjuku vol.39 - Next Generation Cup, Semi Final || Tokyo, Japan || TKO || 2 || 0:09

|-  style="text-align:center; background:#CCFFCC;"
| 2014-09-21|| Win ||align=left| Atsushi Nojou ||J-FIGHT in Shinjuku vol.39 - Next Generation Cup, Quarter Final || Tokyo, Japan || Ext.R Decision (Unanimous)|| 3 || 3:00
|-
| colspan=9 | Legend:

See also
 List of male kickboxers

References

1994 births
Living people
Japanese male kickboxers
Sportspeople from Saitama Prefecture